Eight Frames a Second is the debut album by British folk musician Ralph McTell. Released in the UK in 1968, it is notable for being the first record produced by Gus Dudgeon, and the first arranged by Tony Visconti. Unusually for a new artist, the front of the album sleeve contained no reference to either McTell or the album title. The entire album cost £350 in total.

Track listing
All songs composed by Ralph McTell, except where noted.

Side one
"Nanna's Song" - 3:05
"The Mermaid and the Seagull" - 4:05
"Hesitation Blues" (Traditional; arranged by Ralph McTell) - 2:43
"Are You Receiving Me?" - 3:37
"Morning Dew" (Bonnie Dobson; arranged by Fred Neil) - 3:10
"Sleepytime Blues" - 3:50
Side two
"Eight Frames a Second" - 3:20
"Willoughby's Farm" - 2:00
"Louise" - 3:45
"Blind Blake's Rag" (Traditional; arranged by Ralph McTell) 1:55
"I'm Sorry - I Must Leave" - 2:15
"Too Tight Drag" (Blind Blake) - 2:29
"Granny Takes a Trip" (Geoff Bowyer, Christopher Joe Beard) - 2:40

Personnel
Ralph McTell - guitar, vocals
Mac McGann - double-neck guitar
Mick "Henry VIII" Bartlett - jug
"Whispering Mick" Bennett - washboard
Bob Strawbridge - mandolin
Tony Visconti - arrangements and musical direction
Technical
Bobby Davidson - cover photography
Nickolas Venet - coordinator

Awards and accolades
Ralph McTell was presented with a Gold Disc of Eight Frames a Second during his 60th birthday concert at the Royal Festival Hall in November 2004.

Release history

Many of the tracks on this album also feature on the Spiral Staircase - Classic Songs compilation.

Track variations

The LP released in South Africa in 1975 omits "Nanna's Song", "The Mermaid and the Seagull" and "Hesitation Blues", that are included on Record 1 of the 2-LP set.

The UK 2007 CD release includes four bonus tracks:
14.  "Suzanne" (Leonard Cohen) (1)
15.  "I Love My Baby" (Traditional; arranged by Ralph McTell) (2)
16.  "Boodle Am Shake" (Traditional; arranged by Ralph McTell) (2)
17.  "San Francisco Bay Blues" (Jesse Fuller) (3)

(1) From the original album recording sessions
(2) Live concert recording from 1967
(3) Demo recording with Rick Wakeman (piano).

References

Ralph McTell albums
1968 debut albums
Albums arranged by Tony Visconti
Albums produced by Gus Dudgeon
Capitol Records albums
Transatlantic Records albums
Logo Records albums